SMart was a British CBBC television programme based on art, which began in 1994 and ended in 2009. The programme was recorded at BBC Television Centre in London. Previously it had been recorded in Studio A at Pebble Mill Studios in Birmingham. The format is similar to the Tony Hart programmes Take Hart and Hartbeat. The show was revamped into an hour-long show in 2007; from 1994 to 2006 it was previously a 25-minute show. From 1994 to 2005, the show also featured Morph, originally from Take Hart. The series run featured 199 episodes, last airing on 11 August 2011.

Production
The BBC noticed the success of Art Attack with Neil Buchanan for CITV which started in 1990 and decided to create their own art show that was accessible to children similar to Art Attack.

The original theme tune was composed by Kjartan Poskitt, famous for the Murderous Maths series of books.  From 2003, a different tune was used, written by Steve Brown (known as the fictional musical director Glen Ponder in Knowing Me, Knowing You with Alan Partridge). In 2007, this was remixed by Matt Thomas of Mosquito Music in line with the new format.

In 2007, the new autumn series had a new format mixing some of the old segments with new ideas. It was aired on Sunday, and repeated on Wednesdays. It involved more child participation in games and celebrity guests. This new format also allowed for episodes of The Fairly OddParents (and  sometimes Thumb Wrestling Federation) to be aired halfway in. One of the segments displayed art that had been sent in by viewers, to the backing music of 'Give It Away' by Zero 7.

The format was utilised again when a new series began with a new timeslot on Sunday 29 June 2008, airing on CBBC on BBC Two, still presented by Kirsten O'Brien and Mike Fischetti. A special tribute to Mark Speight was also broadcast. Along with this new format, guest presenters appear each week to assist the two presenters.

Following the death of presenter Mark Speight's fiancée Natasha Collins in January 2008, repeats of the show and its CBeebies spin-off SMarteenies  were suspended.  Speight left the programme, saying his "tragic loss" had left him unable to continue; he later took his own life.  The BBC indicated, however, that there would still be a new series of SMart later that year.

Series 16 began airing on 3 January 2009 in the same style to the series before. The major change was that the original airings moved to the CBBC Channel rather than BBC Two. Kirsten O'Brien and Mike Fischetti both returned to host the show and the show continued to have guest presenters. The games involving children in the studio were dropped and instead children participated via webcam or pre-recorded on location. The show also added segments on fun aspects of digital photography.

Spin-offs
The success of SMart allowed it to spawn various spin-off series.  The first was SMart on the Road where either Mark Speight or Kirsten O'Brien, with the help of Lizi Botham, would travel around the country helping people with major projects, for example decorating a room or making a fun garden.  It starred Kirsten O'Brien, Mark Speight, Jay Burridge and Lizi Botham.

SMarteenies was the second spin-off, where Kirsten, Mark, Jay and "Bizi Lizi" went through fun makes for younger viewers, including man of letters and shapes and Kirsten's Household Makes with Doogie the Dog. This programme was specifically aimed at a younger demographic, roughly from 3–6 years old on was aired on CBeebies.  It starred Kirsten O'Brien, Mark Speight, Jay Burridge and Lizi Botham.

A special episode, SMart Africa, was made by the BBC to coincide with Africa Week. The episode contained easy ways to make things. This episode, with Kirsten O'Brien and Mark Speight, was aired as part of the 2003 series.

Presenters

Guest presenters

2007

2008

2009

Series guide

Smart on the Road series guide

Legacy
In March 2011, CBBC started to air Deadly Art which followed a very similar format to SMart and also stars Mike Fischetti. They look to the wild for inspiration (to tie in with the "Deadly" series e.g. Deadly 60). Then CBBC aired Totally Rubbish and their current art series is Art Ninja, whose presenter Ricky Martin said he watched Art Attack and SMart religiously as a child.

References

External links
CBBC Homepage

BBC children's television shows
1994 British television series debuts
2009 British television series endings
1990s British children's television series
2000s British children's television series
Television series about art
English-language television shows
Television series by BBC Studios